The 2007 Alpine Skiing World Cup – Men's Downhill season involved 10 events at sites in North America and Europe between November 2006 and March 2007. Swiss's Didier Cuche won the individual title, while his Austrian team took the team title.

Calendar

Final point standings

In Men's Downhill World Cup 2006/07 all results count.

Note:

In the last race only the best racers were allowed to compete and only the best 15 finishers were awarded with points.

Men's Downhill Team Results

Bold indicates highest score - Italics indicates race wins

External links
FIS-ski.com - Downhill World Cup 2007

External links
 

World Cup
FIS Alpine Ski World Cup men's downhill discipline titles